Stardust: Vignettes from the Fringes of Film Industry is an Indian English-language non-fiction book written by Roopa Swaminathan. It won the 2004 National Film Award for Best Book on Cinema.

References

2004 non-fiction books
Indian non-fiction books
Penguin Books India books
Best Book on Cinema National Film Award winners
21st-century Indian books